Idalus vitreoides is a moth of the family Erebidae. It was described by Walter Rothschild in 1922. It is known from Trinidad, Costa Rica, and Brazil.

References

vitreoides
Moths described in 1922